It was on Yesterday 2 is a 2018 Burmese action-crime television series. It aired on MRTV-4, from September 18 to October 29, 2018, on Monday to Friday at 19:00 for 30 episodes.

Cast
Aung Min Khant as Thuta
Khar Ra as Ye Naung
Tyron Bejay as Khant Hte
Kyaw Kyaw Bo as U Thiha
Aye Myat Thu as Khat Khat Khaing
Su Pan Htwar as Daw Thidar
 Than Thar Moe Theint as Pan Thu
 Min Phone Myat as Tharr Zaw
 Kaung Sett Naing as Kyaw Htin
 Thet Oo Ko as Shine

See also
It was on Yesterday

References

Burmese television series
MRTV (TV network) original programming